Benedict Jones is a research psychologist and lecturer at the University of Glasgow who studies the biological and social factors underlying face perception and preferences. He received his PhD from the University of St Andrews in 2005, where he studied with David Perrett.

He is best known for work on the hormonal mechanisms that underlie face preferences, especially how hormonal fluctuations during the menstrual cycle and pregnancy affect preferences for a healthy appearance.

Publications

 Jones, BC, DeBruine, LM, Little, AC, Burriss, RB, Feinberg, DR (2007). Social transmission of face preferences among humans. Proceedings of the Royal Society of London, B.
 Jones, BC, DeBruine, LM, Little, AC, Conway, CA, Feinberg, DR (2006). Integrating gaze direction and expression in preferences for attractive faces. Psychological Science, 17(7): 588–591.
 Jones, BC, Little, AC, Boothroyd, LG, DeBruine, LM, Feinberg, DR, Law Smith, MJ, Cornwell, RE, Moore, FR, Perrett, DI (2005). Commitment to relationships and preferences for femininity and apparent health in faces are strongest on days of the menstrual cycle when progesterone level is high. Hormones and Behavior, 48(3): 283–290.
 Jones, BC, Perrett, DI, Little, AC, Boothroyd, LG, Cornwell, RE, Feinberg, DR, Tiddeman, BP, Whiten, S, Pitman, RM, Hillier, SG, Burt, DM, Stirrat, MR, Law Smith, MJ, Moore, FR (2005). Menstrual cycle, pregnancy and oral contraceptive use alter attraction to apparent health in faces. Proceedings of the Royal Society of London, B, 272(1561): 347–354.
 Little, AC, DeBruine, LM, Jones, BC (all 3 authors contributed equally) (2005). Sex-contingent face aftereffects suggest distinct neural populations code male and female faces. Proceedings of the Royal Society of London, B, 272(1578): 2283–2287.
 Jones, BC, Little, AC, Boothroyd, LG, Feinberg, DR, Cornwell, RE, DeBruine, LM, Roberts, SC, Penton-Voak, IS, Law Smith, MJ, Moore, FR, Davis, HP, Perrett, DI (2005). Women's physical and psychological condition independently predict their preference for apparent health in faces. Evolution and Human Behavior, 26(6): 451–457.
 Jones, BC, Little, AC, Feinberg, DR, Penton-Voak, IS, Tiddeman, BP, Perrett, DI (2004). The relationship between shape symmetry and perceived skin condition in male facial attractiveness. Evolution and Human Behavior, 25: 249–30.
 Jones, BC, Little, AC, Burt, DM, Perrett, DI (2004). When facial attractiveness is only skin deep. Perception, 33: 569–576.
 Jones, BC, Jones, BT, Blundell, L, Bruce, G (2002). Social users of alcohol and cannabis who detect substance-related changes in a change blindness paradigm report higher levels of use than those detecting substance-neutral changes. Psychopharmacology, 165(4): 93–96.
 Jones, BC, Little, AC, Penton-Voak, IS, Tiddeman, BP, Burt, DM, Perrett, DI (2001). Facial symmetry and judgements of apparent health: Support for a 'good genes' explanation of the attractiveness-symmetry relationship. Evolution and Human Behavior, 22: 417–429.

References
 Beauty in the eye of other beholders – Scientific American
 Admirers 'increase male appeal' – BBC
 Mums-to-be face healthy dilemma – BBC
 Pill changes women's taste in men – BBC
 Beauty is in the eye of the beerholder – BBC
 Face value – New Scientist

External links
 Scientific Articles by Benedict Jones
 The Face Research Lab
 FaceResearch.org – Online experiments

Year of birth missing (living people)
Living people
Academics of the University of Aberdeen
Alumni of the University of St Andrews
British psychologists
Evolutionary psychologists